Kyzyl-Yulduz (Qıźıl Yondoź) is a rural locality (a village) in Bazitamaksky Selsoviet, Ilishevsky District, Bashkortostan, Russia. The population was 85 as of 2010. There are 2 streets.

Geography 
Kyzyl-Yulduz is located 40 km northeast of Verkhneyarkeyevo (the district's administrative centre) by road. Vostok is the nearest rural locality.

References 

Rural localities in Ilishevsky District